The Tournament of Chauvency was held in 1285 to bring together the greatest knights of France and Germany for six days of jousting and other activities, a social event of primary importance at the end of the thirteenth century.  Dedicated to Henry IV, Count of Salm, the tournament was organized by Louis V, Count of Chiny, and held in the small village of Chauvency-le-Château, near Montmédy.

The tournament was documented in the poem le Tournoi de Chauvency by the thirteenth century trouvère Jacques Bretel. The miniatures of the Oxford manuscript show knights struggling during the jousting and other activities of the tournament.

Nearly 500 knights and other royalty and their wives participated in the tournament.  Most notable are:
 Rudolf I, King of Germany
 Ottokar II, King of Bohemia (see below)
 Frederick III, Duke of Lorraine
 John I, Duke of Brabant 
Jean de Faucogney, viscount of Vesoul 
 Theobald II, Count of Bar
 Henry III, Count of Bar, son of the previous
 John of Bar, brother of the previous
 Louis V, Count of Chiny
 Jeanne de Bar, wife of the previous
 Gerard de Looz, Seigneur de Chauvency le-Château, brother of Louis V
 Henry V the  Blond, Count of Luxembourg
 Margaret of Bar, wife of the previous
 Henry VI the Condemned, Count of Luxembourg
 Béatrice d'Avesnes, wife of Henry VI of Luxembourg
 Waleran I, Lord of Ligny
 Thomas of Blankenberg, step-son of Louis V (son of Jeanne of Bar and her first husband Frederick de Blâmont)
 Guy of Dampierre, Count of Flanders
 Philip of Chieti, youngest child of Guy
 John I, Count of Hainaut
 John II, Count of Holland, son of John I
 Florent of Hainaut
 Renaud I, Count of Dammartin.

Note that Ottokar II was killed on 26 August 1278 at the Battle on the Marchfeld (by the troops of Rudolf) as so was clearly not at the tournament as reported by Bretel.

A fanciful description of the tournament activities can be found in the book The Reign of Chivalry by British historian Richard Barber.

According to Laret-Kayser, Louis V used to tournament to promote his family's illustrious history, from being descended from Charlemagne to his ancestor Arnold I, Count of Chiny, sending his sons to fight in the First Crusade.

Sources 
Bretel, Jacques, Le Tournoi de Chauvency, 1285 (manuscripts: Mons MS 330-215 and Oxford MS Douce 308)
Henriot-Walzer, Dominique, Dictionnaire du Tournoi de Chauvency, 1285
Oxford, Bodleian, manuscrit MS Douce 308 (15 miniatures, visibles sur Oxford University Librairies Collections Spéciales LUNA) cf supra.
Barber, Richard W., The Reign of Chivalry, Boydell Press, Suffolk, 2005, pages 27–30 (available on Google Books)
Laret-Kayser, Arlette,  Entre Bar et Luxembourg : Le Comté de Chiny des Origines à 1300, Bruxelles (éditions du Crédit Communal, Collection Histoire, série in-8°, n° 72), 1986

References 

French
Medieval French knights
Medieval German knights